is a 1979 Japanese film directed by Ikuo Sekimoto.

Cast
Sumie Sasaki
Shinobu Yūki
Kan Mikami
Terumi Azuma
Sayoko Tanimoto

Awards
1st Yokohama Film Festival
8th Best Film

References

1979 films
Films directed by Ikuo Sekimoto
1970s Japanese films